This is a list of zoos, aviaries, aquaria, safari parks, reptile centers, animal theme parks and wildlife parks in Pakistan.

For a list of botanical gardens, see List of botanical gardens in Pakistan.

Public zoos
 Bahria Town Zoos, Lahore
 Bahawalpur Zoo, Bahawalpur, Punjab
 Citi Housing Zoos, Gujranwala
 DG Khan Zoo, Dera Ghazi Khan
 Faisalabad Zoo Park, Faisalabad
 Hyderabad Zoo, Hyderabad, Sindh
 Islamabad Zoo, Islamabad, Capital Territory
 Karachi Zoo, Karachi, Sindh
 Lahore Zoo, Lahore, Punjab
 Landhi Korangi Zoo, Karachi, Sindh
 Multan zoo, Multan
 Peshawar Zoo, Peshawar, Khyber Pakhtunkhwa
 Rawalpindi Zoo, Rawalpindi
 Wildlife Park, Rahim Yar Khan, Punjab
 Rafay Monkey House, Toba tek singh, Punjab
 Multi Gardens Zoo, B-17, Islamabad
 Bahria Enclave Zoo  , Bahria Enclave, Islamabad

Animal theme parks
Jungle World (formerly Jungle Kingdom), Rawalpindi, Punjab
Kund Park, Nowshera, Khyber Pakhtunkhwa
Lake View Park, Islamabad, Capital Territory

Safari parks
 Jallo Wildlife Park, Lahore, Punjab
 Lal Suhanra National Park, Bahawalpur, Punjab
 Lahore Zoo Safari, Lahore, Punjab formerly Lahore Wildlife Park also called Woodland Wildlife Park
 Lohi Bher Wildlife Park, Rawalpindi, Punjab
 Murree Wildlife Park, Murree, Punjab also known as Murree National Park
 Karachi Safari Park, Karachi, Sindh
 Rana Safari Park, Head Balloki, Lahore, Punjab

Aviaries
 Changa Manga Vulture Center, Lahore, Punjab
 Dhodial Pheasantry, Mansehra, Khyber Pakhtunkhwa
 Karachi Walkthrough Aviary, Karachi, Sindh
 Lahore Walkthrough Aviary, Lahore, Punjab
 Lake View Park Aviary, Islamabad, Capital Territory
 Lakki Marwat Crane Center, Lakki Marwat, Khyber Pakhtunkhwa
 Saidpur Hatchery, Islamabad, Capital Territory

Aquaria
 Clifton Fish Aquarium, Karachi, Sindh
 Karachi Municipal Aquarium, Karachi, Sindh
 Landhi Korangi Aquarium, Karachi, Sindh

Wildlife parks

Breeding centers
 Changa Manga Breeding Center, Lahore, Punjab
 Faisalabad Breeding Center, Faisalabad, Punjab
 Hawke's Bay/Sandspit Turtle Hatchery, Karachi, Sindh
 Jallo Breeding Center, Lahore, Punjab
 Rawat Breeding Center, Rawalpindi, Punjab

See also
List of botanical gardens in Pakistan
List of parks and gardens in Pakistan
List of zoos

References
Notes

Sources
Zoos, aquariums, animal sanctuaries and wildlife parks worldwide 
Zoos and breeding centers of Pakistan
kidsplane.com Pakistan zoos

External links

World Association of Zoos and Aquariums

Zoos
 
Pakistan
Parks in Pakistan
Zoos